Ramta Jogi is a 2015 Indian Punjabi-language romance film directed by Guddu Dhanoa and produced by Vijay Singh Dhanoa under banner Vijayta Films and I`MPossible Films. It stars Deep Sidhu, Ronica Singh, Rahul Dev, Girish Sahdev, Zafar Dhilon and Anil Grover. The movie is a remake of 2004 Tamil movie Kaadhal.

Synopsis 
An intense love story placed in the land of Punjab. The main protagonist named Jogi (Ramta Jogi), comes from a humble background and the girl, Meet belongs to a well off family. Unlike the traditional way, here in the film the girl falls in love with Jogi and approaches him. After the love story starts in terms of family getting involved in it and oppose their love. Both the youngsters deeply in love take the charge to be with each other and their journey starts from Punjab and how it unfolds in Mumbai showing their struggle and the challenges faced in the city like Mumbai. While all this is happening their families takes them back to Punjab. 
Based on the unwanted circumstances created by their families, the climax unfolds which is unusual in terms of emotion and has never been witnessed in the Punjabi cinema before.

Cast
 Deep Sidhu
 Ronica Singh
 Rahul Dev
 Girish Sahdev
 Zafar Dhilon
 Anil Grove

Reception

Box office

Soundtrack

References

External links

Punjabi remakes of Tamil films
Punjabi-language Indian films
2010s Punjabi-language films
Films directed by Guddu Dhanoa